The Prague Conservatory or Prague Conservatoire is a music school in Prague, Czech Republic, founded in 1808. Currently, Prague Conservatory offers four or six year study courses, which can be compared to the level of high school diploma in other countries. Graduates of Prague Conservatory can continue their training by enrolling in an institution that offers undergraduate education.

History 
The Prague Conservatory was founded in 1808 by local aristocrats and burghers following examples of Conservatoire de Paris (est. 1795) and Milan Conservatory (est. 1807). It belongs to the oldest modern existing music conservatories in the world. Classes started in 1811, after a delay caused by the Napoleonic Wars. Bedřich Diviš Weber was appointed the first director of the school.

In 1891, Antonín Dvořák joined the faculty as the head of the composition department. He was the school's director between 1901 and 1904. Dvořák's students included the composers Vítězslav Novák, Josef Suk (who later served as director of the Conservatory), Rudolf Friml, Oskar Nedbal, and Franz Lehár. Another director of the school was pianist Vilém Kurz.

Following the creation of Czechoslovakia in 1918, drama and ballet departments were established. Students in this period included Lída Baarová (dropped out), Jiří Langmajer, Tatiana Vilhelmová (dropped out), Filip Blažek, and Zuzana Vejvodová. Katya Zvelebilova began classical ballet training at the Prague Conservatory before joining the Royal Ballet School in London, where she is now a member of the artistic staff, having retired from professional ballet.

Instruction 
Applicants must pass stringent entrance examinations, often held in several elimination rounds, to demonstrate their talent. Applications are accepted once a year (with a deadline usually at the end of November), and auditions take place at the end of January. 

Prague Conservatory offers instruction in several instruments, including accordion, guitar, piano, and organ, as well as in singing, composing, conducting, and acting. The curriculum includes one-on-one music lessons, music theory studies, language training, as well as classes on general subjects. The institution has its own symphonic and chamber orchestras, choir, several chamber music ensembles and a theatre company. About 250 concerts and 40 dramatic performances take place annually.

In the academic year of 2005–2006, approximately 550 Czech and 40 foreign students studied at the Conservatory.

Notable alumni

Karel Ančerl
Jiří Bělohlávek
František Brikcius
František Brož
Oliver Butterworth
Andrea Černá
Ladislav Černý
Ludmila Červinková
Radim Drejsl
Gabriela Eibenová
Maria Forescu
Rudolf Friml
Julius Fučík
Wolfgang Hildemann
Jan Hřímalý
Kateřina Jalovcová
Jaroslav Ježek
Jana Jonášová
Naděžda Kniplová
Pavel Kohout
Jan Kubelík
Rafael Kubelík
Otomar Kvěch
Franz Lehar
Manoah Leide-Tedesco
Zuzana Marková (soprano)
Bohuslav Martinů
Pauline Metzler-Löwy
Oskar Nedbal
Václav Neumann
Vítězslav Novák
Jana Obrovská
Karel Paukert
Michael Pospíšil
Alexandre Rudajev
František Salzer
George Schick
Otakar Ševčík
Lucijan Marija Škerjanc
Franz Simandl
Yngve Sköld
Josef Slavik
Václav Smetáček
Eugen Suchoň 
Josef Suk
Jana Sýkorová
Jan Talich
Václav Talich
Jiří Tancibudek
Jan Thuri
Vaclav Vaca
Vilém Veverka
Tomáš Víšek
Sláva Vorlová
Pavla Vykopalová
John Stepan Zamecnik

Notable faculty
František Brož
Ladislav Černý
Kateřina Emingerová
Emil Hlobil
Valentina Kameníková
Saša Večtomov

References

External links 

 Official page

 
Educational institutions established in 1808
Theatre in the Czech Republic
Music schools in the Czech Republic